Richard Jebb (1874 – 25 June 1953) was an English journalist and author in the field of Empire and colonial nationalism.

Life
Jebb was born in 1874. His parents were cousins Eglantyne Louisa (born Jebb) and Arthur Trevor Jebb. His sister Louisa (Wilkins) established the forerunner of the Women's Land Army during the first world war. Another two of his sisters Eglantyne and Dorothy (became Buxton) co-founded the children's international development agency Save the Children.
Jebb was the nephew of the classical scholar and politician, Sir Richard Claverhouse Jebb. He went to school at Marlborough College followed by New College, Oxford.

During the First World War, Jebb was a captain in the King's Shropshire Light Infantry, spending most of the war in England, serving as an instructor.

References

External links
Institute of Commonwealth Studies: Richard Jebb (1874–1953)

1874 births
1953 deaths
King's Shropshire Light Infantry officers
English non-fiction writers
English male journalists
People educated at Marlborough College
Alumni of New College, Oxford
English male non-fiction writers
British Army personnel of World War I